Lewis Yarlupurka O'Brien  (born 25 March 1930), usually known as Uncle Lewis O'Brien, is an Aboriginal elder of the Kaurna people.

Name
Yarlupurka was in 2021 adopted by Uncle Lewis as the preferred spelling of his traditional name, following clarification of the Kaurna alphabet. Previous spellings variously included Yerloburka, Yarloburka, Yarluburka and Yurlaburka.

Early life and education
Lewis Yarlupurka O'Brien was born at Point Pearce Mission on Yorke Peninsula in South Australia in 1930. His father was Irish, born in County Cork. His great, great grandmother was Kudnarto, who relocated from the northern parts of Kaurna country, near Clare in the nineteenth century due to dispossession of land holdings. O'Brien was ill as a child and became a ward of the state at age 12. Until the age of 18, he lived in a number of foster homes and boys' homes.

He studied at Point Pearce, Ethelton Primary School and Payneham Primary School. He gained his Intermediate Certificate of education in 1946 from Le Fevre Boys Technical High School at Glanville, South Australia, overcoming extreme difficulties to do so, and gained an apprenticeship as a fitter and machinist with the South Australian Railways, completing in 1952.

Career
In the 1960s, O'Brien became involved with several movements advocating advancement for Aboriginal Australians, including the first Aboriginal Community Centre and the Aboriginal Advancement League. His influence was felt on bodies such as the Aboriginal and Torres Strait Islander Commission; SA Jubilee committees; and various South Australian heritage, sport and recreation committees.

In 1977, he began working in schools, promoting Kaurna language and culture as well as supporting Indigenous students to complete education as a liaison officer for the South Australian Education Department. In 2002, O'Brien, along with Alitya Wallara Rigney and linguist Robert Amery, co-founded Kaurna Warra Pintyanthi (meaning "creating Kaurna language"), a group developing and promoting the recovery of the Kaurna language.  For over 30 years he worked in Aboriginal education, touching every sector.

He has also done a great deal of research and scholarly work. He served as Adjunct Research Fellow, David Unaipon College of Indigenous Education and Research, University of South Australia and is a Senior Elder on Campus at Flinders University.

Memoir
In 2007, O'Brien published his memoir And the clock struck thirteen: The life and thoughts of Kaurna Elder Uncle Lewis Yerloburka O'Brien as told to Mary-Anne Gale, published by Wakefield Press.

Awards and honours
1977: NAIDOC Elder of the Year
2001: Centenary Medal, "For service to the Aboriginal people of South Australia and in particular, Port Adelaide"
2009: Citizen of Humanity, awarded by the National Committee of Human Rights
2014: Officer of the Order of Australia, "For distinguished service to the Indigenous community of South Australia as an elder and educator, and to the promotion and protection of Indigenous culture and heritage", in the Queen's Birthday Honours List, 9 June 2014
2019: Winner of the Premier's NAIDOC Award, a South Australian award presented during NAIDOC Week

References

1930 births
Living people
Australian Aboriginal elders
Australian indigenous rights activists
Australian people of Irish descent
Indigenous Australian welfare workers
Kaurna
Officers of the Order of Australia
People from South Australia